21 Jump Street is a 2012 American buddy cop action comedy film directed by Phil Lord and Christopher Miller (in their live action directional debuts), written by Jonah Hill and Michael Bacall, and starring Hill and Channing Tatum. An adaptation of  the 1987–1991 television series of the same name by Stephen J. Cannell and Patrick Hasburgh, the film follows police officers Schmidt and Jenko, who are forced to relive high school when they are assigned to go undercover as high school students to prevent the outbreak of a new synthetic drug and arrest its supplier.

The film was released theatrically on March 16, 2012 by Columbia Pictures and Metro-Goldwyn-Mayer. It received positive reviews from critics and grossed $201 million worldwide. A sequel, titled 22 Jump Street, was released on June 13, 2014, and in 2015 a female-led spin-off was in development with main stars cast in 2018 and the first draft completed in 2020.

Plot

In 2005, scholarly student Morton Schmidt and popular underachieving jock Greg Jenko miss their school prom, Schmidt being rejected by the girl he was trying to ask to be his date and Jenko being barred from attending due to failing grades. Seven years later, the duo meets again at the police academy and become friends and partners on bicycle patrol. They catch a break when they arrest Domingo, the leader of a one-percenter motorcycle gang, but are forced to release him after they failed to read him his Miranda rights.

The duo is reassigned to a revived scheme from the 1980s, which specializes in infiltrating high schools. Captain Dickson assigns them to contain the spread of a synthetic drug called HFS ("Holy Fucking Shit") at Sagan High School. He gives them new identities and enrolls them as students, giving them class schedules fitting their previous academic performances; Jenko taking mostly arts and humanities, and Schmidt taking mostly science classes, but the duo mixes up their identities. Schmidt gets a lead on HFS from classmate Molly, and he and Jenko meet the school's main dealer, popular student Eric. The two take HFS in front of him to maintain their cover. After experiencing the drug's effects, the duo discovers that Schmidt's intelligence now makes him popular, while Jenko's lax attitude is frowned upon.

Eric takes a liking to Schmidt, who develops a romantic interest in Molly. Jenko becomes friends with the students in his AP Chemistry class and finds himself becoming more interested in geeky hobbies and academic pursuits. Schmidt and Jenko throw a party at Schmidt's parents' house, where they are living during the course of their assignment, and invite Eric. During the party, a fight breaks out between Schmidt, Jenko, and some party crashers. Schmidt wins the fight, solidifying his social status and gaining Eric's trust. Jenko's friends hack Eric's phone to enable them to listen in on his conversations.

At a party at Eric's house, using the phone hack, Jenko and his friends overhear information about an upcoming meeting between Eric and his supplier, but also catch Schmidt making disparaging comments about Jenko. The rift between the duo grows as their new school life intrudes upon their official police work. Schmidt and Jenko track Eric to a cash transaction with the distributors of HFS — the motorcycle gang from the park — and a chase ensues on the freeway. They return to school, argue, and eventually begin fighting, which disrupts the school play. They are expelled from school and fired from the Jump Street program.

Eric, stressed and terrified, recruits Schmidt and Jenko as security for a deal taking place at the school prom. While dressing for the prom, Schmidt and Jenko rekindle their friendship. At the prom, they discover that the supplier is the physical education teacher, Mr. Walters, who created the drug accidentally and started selling it to the students to supplement his teacher's salary and pay alimony to his ex-wife. Having caught Eric smoking marijuana, he was able to persuade him to be his dealer.

The motorcycle gang arrives for the deal but Molly interrupts them and starts arguing with Schmidt. As a result, gang leader Domingo recognizes Schmidt and Jenko and orders his men to kill them. Two of the gang members reveal themselves as undercover DEA agents Tom Hanson and Doug Penhall, and former members of the 21 Jump Street program. In the ensuing exchange of gunfire, Hanson and Penhall are both shot and mortally wounded. Mr. Walters and Eric escape with the money and Molly as a hostage; the gang, Schmidt, and Jenko follow close behind. Jenko creates a homemade bomb and uses it to kill the gang. Mr. Walters shoots at Schmidt but Jenko takes the bullet to his arm, sparing Schmidt's life. In response, Schmidt shoots Mr. Walters, unintentionally severing his penis. They arrest Mr. Walters and Eric, successfully reading the former his Miranda rights. Schmidt and Molly share a kiss.

Both officers are congratulated and reinstated in the Jump Street program as Dickson gives them a new assignment: infiltrating a college.

Cast
 Jonah Hill as Morton Schmidt, a socially awkward yet smart police officer
 Channing Tatum as Greg Jenko, a slow-witted yet handsome cop
 Brie Larson as Molly Tracey, one of Eric's friends and Schmidt's love interest
 Dave Franco as Eric Molson, a student who is one of the HFS dealers
 Rob Riggle as Mr. Walters, a physical education teacher
 DeRay Davis as Domingo, the leader of the One-Percenters
 Ice Cube as Captain Dickson, a coarse police captain who manages 21 Jump Street
 Dax Flame as Zack, Jenko's friend who is a science genius and plants the bug in Eric's cellphone.
 Chris Parnell as Mr. Gordon, a drama teacher
 Ellie Kemper as Ms. Griggs, a science teacher who has a sexual interest towards Jenko that she believes is a student and doesn't know he is a cop
 Jake Johnson as Principal Dadier, the principal of Sagan High
 Nick Offerman as Deputy Chief Hardy
 Holly Robinson Peete as Officer Judy Hoffs
 Johnny Pemberton as Delroy
 Stanley Wong as Roman
 Justin Hires as Juario
 Brett Lapeyrouse as Amir
 Lindsey Broad as Lisa
 Caroline Aaron as Annie Schmidt
 Joe Chrest as David Schmidt
 Geraldine Singer as Phyllis
 Dakota Johnson as Fugazy
 Rye Rye as Jr. Jr.
 Valerie Tian as Burns
 Jaren Mitchell as Sanders
 Johnny Simmons as Billiam Willingham, a Sagan High student who died due to HFS
 Spencer Boldman as French Samuels
 Luis Da Silva as One-percenter #3 – Luis
 Johnny Depp (uncredited cameo) as Tom Hanson
 Peter DeLuise (uncredited cameo) as Doug Penhall

Production
In May 2008, Sony Pictures confirmed that a film adaptation of the series was under development. Jonah Hill rewrote an existing script by screenwriter Joe Gazzam and executive produced the film, as well as starred in the film. Hill has said he wanted horror director Rob Zombie to direct the picture. In May 2009, Hill described the film adaptation as being an "R-rated, insane, Bad Boys-meets-John Hughes-type movie". On December 21, 2009, it was announced that Sony was in talks with Cloudy with a Chance of Meatballs directing duo, Phil Lord and Christopher Miller, to direct the film. The film follows the same continuity as the TV series; Lord said, "So, all of those events of the original happened. And now here we are 20 years later, and we're watching it happen to different people." However, the film features a highly comedic tone, departing radically from the more dramatic and earnest tone of the series.

Filming
The film was shot in and around the city of Metairie, Louisiana (suburb of New Orleans) in 2011, although the filmmakers took elaborate steps to disguise the location as a generic city named "Metropolitan City". They replaced distinctive street signs with signs using a Helvetica typeface, digitally removed billboards from local businesses (except the recognizable local RTA signs toward the end of the film as well as a Zatarain's billboard ad), and avoided filming locations with iconic New Orleans imagery. Despite this, signature landmarks such as the Crescent City Connection and distinctive French Quarter–area street are still partially visible. The main school used as the stand-in for the fictional Sagan High School was Riverdale High School, located in Jefferson, Louisiana. The naked baby pictures of Hill's character used in the film were actual pictures of Hill as a child. The band scene was filmed at Belle Chasse High School in Belle Chasse, Louisiana.
Filming was completed in July 2011.

Music
The score for the film was composed by Mark Mothersbaugh. In September 2014, it was released by La-La Land Records on a double disc album, limited to 2,000 copies. The second disc of the album also contains the score from the film's sequel, 22 Jump Street, composed by Mothersbaugh as well. A modernized cover of the original television's theme song by Rye Rye (who had a small part in the film) and Esthero was released as a single in the iTunes Store.

In addition, a total of 21 songs were licensed for use in the film. The songs featured in the film include:

 "The Real Slim Shady" – Eminem
 "Police and Thieves" – The Clash
 "You Can't Lose" – The Knux
 "Boombox" – Dirt Nasty
 "Caesar" – Ty Segall
 "Helena Beat" – Foster the People
 "So Into You" – Atlanta Rhythm Section
 "Party Rock Anthem" – LMFAO
 "Straight Outta Compton" – N.W.A
 "Get Me Golden" – Terraplane Sun
 "Swell Window" – Zee Avi
 "Lookin' Fly" (feat. Will.i.am) – Murs
 "Rescue Song" – Mr. Little Jeans
 "Graduation (Friends Forever)" – Vitamin C
 "Call the Police" – Ini Kamoze
 "21 Jump Street – Main Theme (From the Motion Picture "21 Jump Street")" – Rye Rye & Esthero
 "21 Jump Street (Main Theme)" – Wallpaper.
 "You Are the Best" – Tim Myers
 "Every Time I See Your Face" – Elon

Release

The premiere of 21 Jump Street took place on March 12, 2012, at the Paramount Theatre in Austin, Texas, during SXSW. The film opened in a wide release in theaters on March 16, 2012. 21 Jump Street grossed $138.4 million in the United States and Canada and $63.1 million in other countries for a worldwide total of $201.6 million; it is also the top-grossing high school comedy film of all-time. The film grossed $13.2 million on its opening day. During the weekend, the film grossed $35 million, taking The Lorax out of the #1 spot that it held for its first two weeks.

21 Jump Street was released on DVD and Blu-ray in Canada and the United States on June 26, 2012 and was released in the United Kingdom on July 9, 2012. Some of the Blu-ray bonus features include 20 deleted scenes and "Johnny Depp on Set" explaining how they brought Johnny Depp to reprise his role as Tom Hanson. It was revealed that Depp wanted his character to die, but for unknown reasons. In one of the deleted scenes, Tom and his partner, Doug Penhall, were shown to have survived the shootout.

Reception
On Rotten Tomatoes, a review aggregator, the film has an approval rating of 85% based on 227 reviews and an average rating of 7.20/10. The site's critical consensus reads, "A smart, affectionate satire of '80s nostalgia and teen movie tropes, 21 Jump Street offers rowdy mainstream comedy with a surprisingly satisfying bite." On Metacritic, the film has a score of 69 out of 100 based on 41 critics, indicating "generally favorable reviews". Audiences polled by CinemaScore gave the film an average grade of "B" on an A+ to F scale.

Richard Roeper of The Chicago-Sun Times gave the film a grade of a B+ saying, "I didn't think we needed a 21 Jump Street, but it's actually kind of funny." David Hynes of WhatCulture ranked the script third in a list of the "10 Best Movie Screenplays Since 2010", writing, "A key aspect to the script's success is how it sets up its story with such economy of means. We begin in medias res, and within ten pages establish (in a single shot) [...] all the conflict, interpersonal and personal [...] I groaned when I heard Tatum and Hill had been cast as the lead, but they proved to be a great double-act who did justice to the script's nutty humour."

Accolades

The film was listed as the number 6 most illegally downloaded film of 2012 using the BitTorrent protocol with approximately 7.6 million downloads.

Sequels and spin-offs

22 Jump Street

In March 2012, Sony Pictures announced that it was pursuing a sequel to the film, signing a deal that would see Hill and Bacall return to write a script treatment that would be again developed by Bacall. Hill and Tatum returned to star in the film. They were executive producers as well, alongside producer Neal H. Moritz. Phil Lord and Christopher Miller returned to direct this sequel. The film was originally scheduled to be released on June 6, 2014. In May 2013, it was announced that the film would be pushed back a week until June 13, 2014. The film's title was 22 Jump Street. Like the first film, 22 Jump Street received positive reviews.

23 Jump Street
On September 2013, 23 Jump Street was announced to be in development. Commenting on the project, Tatum stated, "I don't know if that joke works three times, so we'll see." On September 8, 2022, it was revealed that Qmars Mootab is set to direct a new take on 23 Jump Street.

MIB 23
On December 10, 2014, it was revealed that Sony was planning a crossover between Men in Black and Jump Street. The news was leaked after Sony's system was hacked and then confirmed by the directors of the films, Chris Miller and Phil Lord, during an interview about it. In March 2016, James Bobin signed on as director.

Jump Street: Now for Her Pleasure
In April 2015, a female-centered Jump Street film was announced to be in development. In December 2016, Rodney Rothman was signed on as writer/director. In December 2018, Tiffany Haddish was cast as the main star, while Zendaya and Awkwafina were also in negotiations for roles. By November 2020, it was revealed that Wendy Molyneux and Lizzie Molyneux-Logelin had completed a draft of the script, while the official title was announced to be Jump Street: Now for Her Pleasure.

References

External links

 
 
 

21 Jump Street
2010s buddy cop films
2010s police comedy films
2012 3D films
2012 comedy films
2012 films
2012 action comedy films
2010s high school films
2010s satirical films
American 3D films
American action comedy films
American buddy cop films
American high school films
American satirical films
2010s buddy comedy films
Columbia Pictures films
2010s English-language films
Films about proms
Films based on television series
Films directed by Phil Lord and Christopher Miller
Films produced by Neal H. Moritz
Films scored by Mark Mothersbaugh
Films set in 2005
Films set in 2012
Films shot in Louisiana
Films shot in New Orleans
Films with screenplays by Jonah Hill
Films with screenplays by Michael Bacall
Metro-Goldwyn-Mayer films
Original Film films
Relativity Media films
Self-reflexive films
2010s American films
American buddy comedy films